Haplogroup R1a, or haplogroup R-M420, is a human Y-chromosome DNA haplogroup which is distributed in a large region in Eurasia, extending from Scandinavia and Central Europe to southern Siberia and South Asia.

While R1a originated c. 22,000 to 25,000 years ago, its subclade M417 (R1a1a1) diversified c. 5,800 years ago. The place of origin of the subclade plays a role in the debate about the origins of Proto-Indo-Europeans.

The SNP mutation R-M420 was discovered after R-M17 (R1a1a), which resulted in a reorganization of the lineage in particular establishing a new paragroup (designated R-M420*) for the relatively rare lineages which are not in the R-SRY10831.2 (R1a1) branch leading to R-M17.

Origins

R1a origins
The split of R1a (M420) is computed to c. 22,000 or 25,000 years ago, which is the time of the last glacial maximum. A 2014 study by Peter A. Underhill et al., using 16,244 individuals from over 126 populations from across Eurasia, concluded that there was "a compelling case for the Middle East, possibly near present-day Iran, as the geographic origin of hg R1a". The ancient DNA record has shown the first R1a during the Mesolithic in Eastern Hunter-Gatherers (from Eastern Europe), and the earliest case of R* among Upper Paleolithic Ancient North Eurasians, from which the Eastern Hunter-Gatherers predominantly derive their ancestry.

Diversification of R1a1a1 (M417) and ancient migrations

R1a shows a strong correlation with Indo-European languages of Southern and Western Asia, Central and Eastern Europe and to some extent Scandinavia being most prevalent in Eastern Europe, West Asia, and South Asia. In Europe, Z282 is prevalent particularly while in Asia Z93 dominates. The connection between Y-DNA R-M17 and the spread of Indo-European languages was first noted by T. Zerjal and colleagues in 1999.

Proposed steppe dispersal of R1a1a

 proposed Ukrainian origins, and a postglacial spread of the R1a1 haplogroup during the Late Glacial Maximum, subsequently magnified by the expansion of the Kurgan culture into Europe and eastward. Spencer Wells proposes Central Asian origins, suggesting that the distribution and age of R1a1 points to an ancient migration corresponding to the spread by the Kurgan people in their expansion from the Eurasian steppe.

Three genetic studies in 2015 gave support to the Kurgan theory of Gimbutas regarding the Indo-European Urheimat. According to those studies, haplogroups R1b and R1a, now the most common in Europe (R1a is also common in South Asia) would have expanded from the Pontic–Caspian steppes, along with the Indo-European languages; they also detected an autosomal component present in modern Europeans which was not present in Neolithic Europeans, which would have been introduced with paternal lineages R1b and R1a, as well as Indo-European languages.

 noted that R1a in South Asia most "likely spread from a single Central Asian source pool, there do seem to be at least three and probably more R1a founder clades within the Subcontinent, consistent with multiple waves of arrival."

Proposed South Asian origins

Kivisild et al. (2003) have proposed either South or West Asia, while  see support for both South and Central Asia. Sharma et al.(2009) showcased the existence of R1a in India beyond 18,000 years to possibly 44,000 years in origin.

South Asian populations have the highest STR diversity within R1a1a, and subsequent older TMRCA datings, and R1a1a is present among both higher (Brahmin) castes and lower castes, although the frequency is higher among Brahmin castes. Nevertheless, the oldest TMRCA datings of the R1a haplogroup occur in the Saharia tribe, a scheduled caste of the Bundelkhand region. From these findings some researchers have concluded that R1a1a originated in South Asia, excluding a more recent, yet minor, genetic influx from Indo-European migrants in northwestern regions such as Afghanistan, Balochistan, Punjab, and Kashmir.

However, this diversity, and the subsequent older TMRCA-datings, can also be explained by the historically high population numbers, which increases the likelihood of diversification and microsatellite variation. According to Sengupta et al. (2006), "[R1a1 and R2] could have actually arrived in southern India from a southwestern Asian source region multiple times." However, Sengupta also described in this article:

This suggests that the origins of paternal haplogroup R1a point to the Indian subcontinent and not Central Asia.

Proposed Yamnaya origins

David Anthony considers the Yamnaya culture to be the Indo-European Urheimat. Yet, all their seven Yamnaya samples belonged to the R1b-M269 subclade, but no R1a1a has been found in their Yamnaya samples. This raises the question where the R1a1a in the Corded Ware culture came from, if it was not from the Yamnaya culture.

According to Marc Haber, the absence of haplogroup R1a-M458 in Afghanistan does not support a Pontic-Caspian steppe origin for the R1a lineages in modern Central Asian populations. According to Leo Klejn, the absence of haplogroup R1a in Yamnaya remains (despite its presence in Eneolithic Samara and Eastern Hunter Gatherer populations) makes it unlikely that Europeans inherited haplogroup R1a from Yamnaya.  Archaeologist Barry Cunliffe has said that the absence of haplogroup R1a in Yamnaya specimens is a major weakness in Haak's proposal that R1a has a Yamnaya origin.

 do argue for a Yamnaya origin of R1a1a in the Corded Ware culture, noting that several publications point to the presence of R1a1 in the Comb Ware culture.

Proposed Transcaucasia and West Asian origins and possible influence on Indus Valley Civilization

 found that part of the Yamnaya ancestry derived from the Middle East and that neolithic techniques probably arrived at the Yamnaya culture from the Balkans. The Rössen culture (4,600–4,300 BC), which was situated on Germany and predates the Corded Ware culture, an old subclade of R1a, namely L664, can still be found.

Part of the South Asian genetic ancestry derives from west Eurasian populations, and some researchers have implied that Z93 may have come to India via Iran and expanded there during the Indus Valley civilization.

 proposed that the roots of Z93 lie in West Asia, and proposed that "Z93 and L342.2 expanded in a southeasterly direction from Transcaucasia into South Asia", noting that such an expansion is compatible with "the archeological records of eastward expansion of West Asian populations in the 4th millennium BCE culminating in the so-called Kura-Araxes migrations in the post-Uruk IV period."

According to  the diversification of Z93 and the "early urbanization within the Indus Valley ... occurred at [5,600 years ago] and the geographic distribution of R1a-M780 (Figure 3d) may reflect this."  note that "striking expansions" occurred within R1a-Z93 at c. 4,500–4,000 years ago, which "predates by a few centuries the collapse of the Indus Valley Civilisation."

Phylogeny
The R1a family tree now has three major levels of branching, with the largest number of defined subclades within the dominant and best known branch, R1a1a (which will be found with various names such as "R1a1" in relatively recent but not the latest literature).

Topology
The topology of R1a is as follows (codes [in brackets] non-isogg codes): Tatiana et al. (2014) "rapid diversification process of K-M526 likely occurred in Southeast Asia, with subsequent westward expansions of the ancestors of haplogroups R and Q."

 P P295/PF5866/S8 (also known as K2b2).
R (R-M207)
R*
R1 (R-M173)
R1*
R1a (M420) (Eastern Europe, Asia)
R1a*
R1a1 (M459/PF6235, SRY1532.2/SRY10831.2)
R1a1 (M459)
R1a1a (M17, M198)
R1a1a1 (M417, page7)
R1a1a1a (CTS7083/L664/S298)
R1a1a1b (S224/Z645, S441/Z647)
R1a1a1b1 (PF6217/S339/Z283)
R1a1a1b1a (Z282) [R1a1a1a*] (Z282) 
R1a1a1b1a1 [The old topological code is R1a1a1b*，which is outdated and might lead to some confusion.] (M458) [R1a1a1g] (M458)
[R1a1a1g*]
[R1a1a1g1] (M334)
R1a1a1b1a1a (L260/S222) [R1a1a1g2]
R1a1a1b1a2 (S466/Z280, S204/Z91)
R1a1a1b1a2a
R1a1a1b1a2b (CTS1211) [R1a1a1c*] (M558) [R-CTS1211] (V2803/CTS3607/S3363/M558, CTS1211/S3357, Y34/FGC36457)
R1a1a1b1a2b3* (M417+, Z645+, Z283+, Z282+, Z280+, CTS1211+, CTS3402, Y33+, CTS3318+, Y2613+) (Gwozdz's Cluster K)
R1a1a1b1a2b3a (L365/S468)
R1a1a1b1a3 (Z284) [R1a1a1a1] (Z284)
R1a1a1b2 (F992/S202/Z93) [R1a1a2*] (Z93, M746)
R1a1a1b2a (F3105/S340/Z94, L342.2/S278.2) [R1a1b2a*] (Z95) R-Z94 (Z94/F3105/S340, Z95/F3568)
R-Z2124 (Z2121/S3410, Z2124)
[R1a1b2a*] (Z2125)
[R1a1b2a*] (M434) [R1a1a1f] (M434)
[R1a1b2a*] (M204)
[R1a1b2a1*] (M560)
[R1a1b2a2*] (M780, L657) (India)
[R1a1b2a3*] (Z2122, M582)
[R1a1a1c] (M64.2, M87, M204)
[R1a1a1d] (P98)
[R1a1a1d2a]
[R1a1a1e] (PK5)
R1b (M343) (Western Europe)
R2 (India)

Haplogroup R

R-M173 (R1)
R1a is distinguished by several unique markers, including the M420 mutation. It is a subclade of Haplogroup R-M173 (previously called R1). R1a has the sister-subclades Haplogroup R1b-M343, and the paragroup R-M173*.

R-M420 (R1a)
R-M420, defined by the mutation M420, has two branches: R-SRY1532.2, defined by the mutation SRY1532.2, which makes up the vast majority; and R-M420*, the paragroup, defined as M420 positive but SRY1532.2 negative. (In the 2002 scheme, this SRY1532.2 negative minority was one part of the relatively rare group classified as the paragroup R1*.) Mutations understood to be equivalent to M420 include M449, M511, M513, L62, and L63.

Only isolated samples of the new paragroup R-M420* were found by Underhill 2009, mostly in the Middle East and Caucasus: 1/121 Omanis, 2/150 Iranians, 1/164 in the United Arab Emirates, and 3/612 in Turkey. Testing of 7224 more males in 73 other Eurasian populations showed no sign of this category.

This paragroup is now known as R1a2 (R-YP4141). It then has two branches R1a2a (R-YP5018) and R1a2b (R-YP4132).

R-SRY1532.2 (R1a1)
R1a1 is defined by SRY1532.2 or SRY10831.2 (understood to always include SRY10831.2, M448, L122, M459, and M516). This family of lineages is dominated by M17 and M198. In contrast, paragroup R-SRY1532.2* lacks either the M17 or M198 markers.

The R-SRY1532.2* paragroup is apparently less rare than R1*, but still relatively unusual, though it has been tested in more than one survey. Underhill et al. (2009) reported 1/51 in Norway, 3/305 in Sweden, 1/57 Greek Macedonians, 1/150 Iranians, 2/734 ethnic Armenians, and 1/141 Kabardians.  reported R-SRY1532.2* for 1/15 Himachal Pradesh Rajput samples.

R-M17/M198 (R1a1a)
The following SNPs are associated with R1a1a:

R-M417 (R1a1a1)
R1a1a1 (R-M417) is the most widely found subclade, in two variations which are found respectively in Europe (R1a1a1b1 (R-Z282) ([R1a1a1a*] (R-Z282) (Underhill 2014)) and Central and South Asia (R1a1a1b2 (R-Z93) ([R1a1a2*] (R-Z93) Underhill 2014)).

R-Z282 (R1a1a1b1a) (Eastern Europe)
This large subclade appears to encompass most of the R1a1a found in Europe.
 R1a1a1b1a [R1a1a1a* (Underhill (2014))] (R-Z282*) occurs in northern Ukraine, Belarus, and Russia at a frequency of c. 20%.
 R1a1a1b1a3 [R1a1a1a1 (Underhill (2014))] (R-Z284) occurs in Northwest Europe and peaks at c. 20% in Norway.
 R1a1a1c (M64.2, M87, M204) is apparently rare: it was found in 1 of 117 males typed in southern Iran.

R-M458 (R1a1a1b1a1)

R-M458 is a mainly Slavic SNP, characterized by its own mutation, and was first called cluster N. Underhill et al. (2009) found it to be present in modern European populations roughly between the Rhine catchment and the Ural Mountains and traced it to "a founder effect that ... falls into the early Holocene period, 7.9±2.6 KYA." M458 was found in one skeleton from a 14th-century grave field in Usedom, Mecklenburg-Vorpommern, Germany. The paper by Underhill et al. (2009) also reports a surprisingly high frequency of M458 in some Northern Caucasian populations (for example 27.5% among Karachays and 23.5% among Balkars, 7.8% among Karanogays and 3.4% among Abazas).

R-L260 (R1a1a1b1a1a) 
In 2010 it was verified to be a haplogroup identified by its own mutation (SNP). It apparently accounts for about 8% of Polish men, making it the most common subclade in Poland. Outside of Poland it is less common. In addition to Poland, it is mainly found in the Czech Republic and Slovakia, and is considered "clearly West Slavic". The founding ancestor of R-L260 is estimated to have lived between 2000 and 3000 years ago, i.e. during the Iron Age, with significant population expansion less than 1,500 years ago.

R-M334
R-M334 ([R1a1a1g1], a subclade of [R1a1a1g] (M458) c.q. R1a1a1b1a1 (M458)) was found by Underhill et al. (2009) only in one Estonian man and may define a very recently founded and small clade.

R1a1a1b1a2 (S466/Z280, S204/Z91)

R1a1a1b1a2b3* (Gwozdz's Cluster K)
R1a1a1b1a2b3* (M417+, Z645+, Z283+, Z282+, Z280+, CTS1211+, CTS3402, Y33+, CTS3318+, Y2613+) (Gwozdz's Cluster K) is a STR based group that is R-M17(xM458). This cluster is common in Poland but not exclusive to Poland.

R1a1a1b1a2b3a (R-L365)
R1a1a1b1a2b3a (R-L365) was early called Cluster G.

R1a1a1b2 (R-Z93) (Asia)

This large subclade appears to encompass most of the R1a1a found in Asia, being related to Indo-European migrations (including Scythians, Indo-Aryan migrations and so on).

 R-Z93* or R1a1a1b2* (R1a1a2* in Underhill (2014)) is most common (>30%) in the South Siberian Altai region of Russia, cropping up in Kyrgyzstan (6%) and in all Iranian populations (1-8%).
 R-Z2125 occurs at highest frequencies in Kyrgyzstan and in Afghan Pashtuns (>40%). At a frequency of >10%, it is also observed in other Afghan ethnic groups and in some populations in the Caucasus and Iran.
 R-M434 is a subclade of Z2125. It was detected in 14 people (out of 3667 people tested), all in a restricted geographical range from Pakistan to Oman. This likely reflects a recent mutation event in Pakistan.
 R-M560 is very rare and was only observed in four samples: two Burushaski speakers (north Pakistan), one Hazara (Afghanistan), and one Iranian Azerbaijani.
 R-M780 occurs at high frequency in South Asia: India, Pakistan, Afghanistan, and the Himalayas. Turkey share R1a (12.1%) sublineages. Roma from Slovakia share 3% of R1a.The group also occurs at >3% in some Iranian populations and is present at >30% in Roma from Croatia and Hungary.

Geographic distribution of R1a1a

Pre-Historical
In Mesolithic Europe, R1a is characteristic of Eastern Hunter-Gatherers (EHGs). A male EHG of the Veretye culture buried at Peschanitsa near Lake Lacha in Arkhangelsk Oblast, Russia c. 10,700 BCE was found to be a carrier of the paternal haplogroup R1a5-YP1301 and the maternal haplogroup U4a. A Mesolithic male from Karelia c. 8,800 BCE to 7950 BCE has been found to be carrying haplogroup R1a. A Mesolithic male buried at Deriivka c. 7000 BCE to 6700 BCE carried the paternal haplogroup R1a and the maternal U5a2a. Another male from Karelia from c. 5,500 to 5,000 BC, who was considered an EHG, carried haplogroup R1a. A male from the Comb Ceramic culture in Kudruküla c. 5,900 BCE to 3,800 BCE  has been determined to be a carrier of R1a and the maternal U2e1. According to archaeologist David Anthony, the paternal R1a-Z93 was found at Alexandria, Ukraine c. 4000 BCE, Sredny Stog culture, "the earliest known sample to show the genetic adaptation to lactase persistence (13910-T)." R1a has been found in the Corded Ware culture, in which it is predominant. Examined males of the Bronze Age Fatyanovo culture belong entirely to R1a, specifically subclade R1a-Z93.

Haplogroup R1a has later been found in ancient fossils associated with the Urnfield culture; as well as the burial of the remains of the Sintashta, Andronovo, the Pazyryk, Tagar, Tashtyk, and Srubnaya cultures, the inhabitants of ancient Tanais, in the Tarim mummies, and the aristocracy of Xiongnu. The skeletal remains of a father and his two sons, from an archaeological site discovered in 2005 near Eulau (in Saxony-Anhalt, Germany) and dated to about 2600 BCE, tested positive for the Y-SNP marker SRY10831.2. The Ysearch number for the Eulau remains is 2C46S. The ancestral clade was thus present in Europe at least 4600 years ago, in association with one site of the widespread Corded Ware culture.

Historical to recent Europe
In Europe, the R1a1 sub-clade is found at highest levels among peoples of Central and Eastern European descent, with results ranging from 35% to 65% among Czechs, Hungarians, Poles, Slovaks, western Ukrainians (particularly Rusyns), Belarusians, Moldovans, and Russians. In the Baltics, R1a1a frequencies decrease from Lithuania (45%) to Estonia (around 30%).

There is a significant presence in peoples of Scandinavian descent, with highest levels in Norway and Iceland, where between 20 and 30% of men are in R1a1a. Vikings and Normans may have also carried the R1a1a lineage further out, accounting for at least part of the small presence in the British Isles, the Canary Islands, and Sicily. In East Germany, Haplogroup R1a1a averages between 20 and 30%, with a peak in Rostock at 31.3%, it.

In Southern Europe R1a1a is not common, but significant levels have been found in pockets, such as in the Pas Valley in Northern Spain, areas of Venice, and Calabria in Italy. The Balkans shows wide variation between areas with significant levels of R1a1a, for example 36–39% in Slovenia, 27–34% in Croatia, and over 30% in Greek Macedonia, but less than 10% in Albania, Kosovo and parts of Greece south of Olympus gorge.

R1a is virtually composed only of the Z284 subclade in Scandinavia. In Slovenia, the main subclade is Z282 (Z280 and M458), although the Z284 subclade was found in one sample of a Slovenian. There is a negligible representation of Z93 in Turkey, 12,1% West Slavs and Hungarians are characterized by a high frequency of the subclade M458 and a low Z92, a subclade of Z280. Hundreds of Slovenian samples and Czechs lack the Z92 subclade of Z280, while Poles, Slovaks, Croats and Hungarians only show a very low frequency of Z92. The Balts, East Slavs, Serbs, Macedonians, Bulgarians and Romanians demonstrate a ratio Z280>M458 and a high, up to a prevailing share of Z92. Balts and East Slavs have the same subclades and similar frequencies in a more detailed phylogeny of the subclades. The Russian geneticist Oleg Balanovsky speculated that there is a predominance of the assimilated pre-Slavic substrate in the genetics of East and West Slavic populations, according to him the common genetic structure which contrasts East Slavs and Balts from other populations may suggest the explanation that the pre-Slavic substrate of the East Slavs consisted most significantly of Baltic-speakers, which at one point predated the Slavs in the cultures of the Eurasian steppe according to archaeological and toponymic references.

Asia

Central Asia
 found R1a1a in 64% of a sample of the Tajiks of Tajikistan and 63% of a sample of the Kyrgyz of Kyrgyzstan.

 found R1a1a-M17 in 26.0% (53/204) of a set of samples from Afghanistan, including 60% (3/5) of a sample of Nuristanis, 51.0% (25/49) of a sample of Pashtuns, 30.4% (17/56) of a sample of Tajiks, 17.6% (3/17) of a sample of Uzbeks, 6.7% (4/60) of a sample of Hazaras, and in the only sampled Turkmen individual.

 found R1a1a-M198/M17 in 56.3% (49/87) of a pair of samples of Pashtuns from Afghanistan (including 20/34 or 58.8% of a sample of Pashtuns from Baghlan and 29/53 or 54.7% of a sample of Pashtuns from Kunduz), 29.1% (37/127) of a pool of samples of Uzbeks from Afghanistan (including 28/94 or 29.8% of a sample of Uzbeks from Jawzjan, 8/28 or 28.6% of a sample of Uzbeks from Sar-e Pol, and 1/5 or 20% of a sample of Uzbeks from Balkh), 27.5% (39/142) of a pool of samples of Tajiks from Afghanistan (including 22/54 or 40.7% of a sample of Tajiks from Balkh, 9/35 or 25.7% of a sample of Tajiks from Takhar, 4/16 or 25.0% of a sample of Tajiks from Samangan, and 4/37 or 10.8% of a sample of Tajiks from Badakhshan), 16.2% (12/74) of a sample of Turkmens from Jawzjan, and 9.1% (7/77) of a pair of samples of Hazara from Afghanistan (including 7/69 or 10.1% of a sample of Hazara from Bamiyan and 0/8 or 0% of a sample of Hazara from Balkh).

 found R1a1-SRY10831.2 in 30.0% (12/40) of a sample of Tajiks from Tajikistan.

 found R1a-M198 in 6.03% (78/1294) of a set of samples of Kazakhs from Kazakhstan. R1a-M198 was observed with greater than average frequency in the study's samples of the following Kazakh tribes: 13/41 = 31.7% of a sample of Suan, 8/29 = 27.6% of a sample of Oshaqty, 6/30 = 20.0% of a sample of Qozha, 4/29 = 13.8% of a sample of Qypshaq, 1/8 = 12.5% of a sample of Tore, 9/86 = 10.5% of a sample of Jetyru, 4/50 = 8.0% of a sample of Argyn, 1/13 = 7.7% of a sample of Shanyshqyly, 8/122 = 6.6% of a sample of Alimuly, 3/46 = 6.5% of a sample of Alban. R1a-M198 also was observed in 5/42 = 11.9% of a sample of Kazakhs of unreported tribal affiliation.

South Asia
In South Asia, R1a1a has often been observed in a number of demographic groups.

In India, high frequencies of this haplogroup is observed in West Bengal Brahmins (72%) to the east, Gujarat Lohanas (60%)  to the west, Khatris (67%) in the north and Iyengar Brahmins (31%) in the south. It has also been found in several South Indian Dravidian-speaking Adivasis including the Chenchu (26%) and the Valmikis of Andhra Pradesh, Kota (22.58%) and the Kallar of Tamil Nadu suggesting that R1a1a is widespread in Tribal Southern Indians.

Besides these, studies show high percentages in regionally diverse groups such as Manipuris (50%) to the extreme North East and among Punjabis (47%) to the extreme North West.

In Pakistan it is found at 71% among the Mohanna tribe in Sindh province to the south and 46% among the Baltis of Gilgit-Baltistan to the north. Among the Sinhalese of Sri Lanka, 23% were found to be R1a1a (R-SRY1532) positive. Hindus of Chitwan District in the Terai region Nepal show it at 69%.

East Asia
The frequency of R1a1a is comparatively low among some Turkic-speaking groups like Yakuts, yet levels are higher (19 to 28%) in certain Turkic or Mongolic-speaking groups of Northwestern China, such as the Bonan, Dongxiang, Salar, and Uyghurs.

A Chinese paper published in 2018 found R1a-Z94 in 38.5% (15/39) of a sample of Keriyalik Uyghurs from Darya Boyi / Darya Boye Village, Yutian County, Xinjiang (于田县达里雅布依乡), R1a-Z93 in 28.9% (22/76) of a sample of Dolan Uyghurs from Horiqol township, Awat County, Xinjiang (阿瓦提县乌鲁却勒镇), and R1a-Z93 in 6.3% (4/64) of a sample of Loplik Uyghurs from Karquga / Qarchugha Village, Yuli County, Xinjiang (尉犁县喀尔曲尕乡). R1a(xZ93) was observed only in one of 76 Dolan Uyghurs. Note that Darya Boyi Village is located in a remote oasis formed by the Keriya River in the Taklamakan Desert. A 2011 Y-DNA study found Y-dna R1a1 in 10% of a sample of southern Hui people from Yunnan, 1.6% of a sample of Tibetan people from Xizang (Tibet Autonomous Region), 1.6% of a sample of Xibe people from Xinjiang, 3.2% of a sample of northern Hui from Ningxia, 9.4% of a sample of Hazak (Kazakhs) from Xinjiang, and rates of 24.0%, 22.2%, 35.2%, 29.2%  in 4 different samples of Uyghurs from Xinjiang, 9.1% in a sample of Mongols from Inner Mongolia, 10% of a sample of Northern Han Chinese from Gansu and 8.9% of a sample of Northern Han from western Henan. A different subclade of R1 was also found in 1.5% of a sample of northern Hui from Ningxia. in the same study  there were no cases of R1a detected at all in 6 samples of Han Chinese in Yunnan, 1 sample of Han in Guangxi, 5 samples of Han in Guizhou, 2 samples of Han in Guangdong, 2 samples of Han in Fujian, 2 samples of Han in Zhejiang, 1 sample of Han in Shanghai, 1 samples of Han in Jiangxi, 2 samples of Han in Hunan, 1 sample of Han in Hubei, 2 samples of Han in Sichuan, 1 sample of Han in Chongqing, 3 samples of Han in Shandong, 5 samples of Han in Gansu, 3 samples of Han in Jilin and 2 samples of Han in Heilongjiang. In a 2014 paper, R1a1a has been detected in 1.8% (2/110) of Chinese samples. These two samples (R-M17, R-M198, R-M434, R-M458 for both) belonged to Han individuals from Fujian and Shanxi provinces. 40% of Salars, 45.2% of Tajiks of Xinjiang, 54.3% of Dongxiang, 60.6% of Tatars and 68.9% of Kyrgyz in Xinjiang in northwestern China tested in one sample had R1a1-M17. Bao'an (Bonan) had the most haplogroup diversity of 0.8946±0.0305 while the other ethnic minorities in northwestern China had a high haplogroup diversity like Central Asians, of 0.7602±0.0546.

In Eastern Siberia, R1a1a is found among certain indigenous ethnic groups including Kamchatkans and Chukotkans, and peaking in Itel'man at 22%.

West Asia
R1a1a has been found in various forms, in most parts of Western Asia, in widely varying concentrations, from almost no presence in areas such as Jordan, to much higher levels in parts of Kuwait and Iran. The Shimar (Shammar) Bedouin tribe in Kuwait show the highest frequency in the Middle East at 43%.

, noted that in the western part of the country, Iranians show low R1a1a levels, while males of eastern parts of Iran carried up to 35% R1a1a.  found R1a1a in approximately 20% of Iranian males from the cities of Tehran and Isfahan.  in a study of Iran, noted much higher frequencies in the south than the north.

A newer study has found 20.3% R-M17* among Kurdish samples which were taken in the Kurdistan Province in western Iran, 19% among Azerbaijanis in West Azerbaijan, 9.7% among Mazandaranis in North Iran in the province of Mazandaran, 9.4% among Gilaks in province of Gilan, 12.8% among Persian and 17.6% among Zoroastrians in Yazd, 18.2% among Persians in Isfahan, 20.3% among Persians in Khorasan, 16.7% Afro-Iranians, 18.4% Qeshmi "Gheshmi", 21.4% among Persian Bandari people in Hormozgan and 25% among the Baloch people in Sistan and Baluchestan Province.

 found haplogroup R1a in 9.68% (18/186) of a set of samples from Iran, though with a large variance ranging from 0% (0/18) in a sample of Iranians from Tehran to 25% (5/20) in a sample of Iranians from Khorasan and 27% (3/11) in a sample of Iranians of unknown provenance. All Iranian R1a individuals carried the M198 and M17 mutations except one individual in a sample of Iranians from Gilan (n=27), who was reported to belong to R1a-SRY1532.2(xM198, M17).

 found R1a1-SRY10831.2 in 20.8% (16/77) of a sample of Persians collected in the provinces of Khorasan and Kerman in eastern Iran, but they did not find any member of this haplogroup in a sample of 25 Kurds collected in the province of Kermanshah in western Iran.

Further to the north of these Western Asian regions on the other hand, R1a1a levels start to increase in the Caucasus, once again in an uneven way. Several populations studied have shown no sign of R1a1a, while highest levels so far discovered in the region appears to belong to speakers of the Karachay-Balkar language among whom about one quarter of men tested so far are in haplogroup R1a1a.

Historic naming of R1a

The historic naming system commonly used for R1a was inconsistent in different published sources, because it changed often; this requires some explanation.

In 2002, the Y Chromosome Consortium (YCC) proposed a new naming system for haplogroups , which has now become standard. In this system, names with the format "R1" and "R1a" are "phylogenetic" names, aimed at marking positions in a family tree. Names of SNP mutations can also be used to name clades or haplogroups. For example, as M173 is currently the defining mutation of R1, R1 is also R-M173, a "mutational" clade name. When a new branching in a tree is discovered, some phylogenetic names will change, but by definition all mutational names will remain the same.

The 2002 YCC proposal assigned the name R1a to the haplogroup defined by mutation SRY1532.2. This included Eu19 (i.e. R-M17) as a subclade, so Eu19 was named R1a1. Note, SRY1532.2 is also known as SRY10831.2 The discovery of M420 in 2009 has caused a reassignment of these phylogenetic names.( and ) R1a is now defined by the M420 mutation: in this updated tree, the subclade defined by SRY1532.2 has moved from R1a to R1a1, and Eu19 (R-M17) from R1a1 to R1a1a.

More recent updates recorded at the ISOGG reference webpage involve branches of R-M17, including one major branch, R-M417.

See also

Y-DNA R-M207 subclades

Y-DNA backbone tree

Notes

References

Sources 

 
 
 
 

 also at

Further reading 

 See also Supplementary Material.
 A copy can be found here .
 A copy can be found here .

External links 

DNA Tree
 FTDNA R1a Y-chromosome Haplogroup Project
 R1a1a1 and Subclades Y-DNA Project – Background Family Tree DNA R1a1a1
TMRCA
 TMRCA = Time to Most Recent Common Ancestor
Various
 Danish Demes Regional DNA Project: Y-DNA Haplogroup R1a 
 Eurogenes Blog, The Poltovka outlier
 Avotaynu Online, The Y-DNA Fingerprint of the Shpoler Zeida, a Tzaddik Who Touched the World

R
Indo-European genetics
R